The Honda Indy V6, officially called the Honda HI12TT/R, is a 2.2-liter, twin-turbocharged, V-6 engine racing engine, developed and produced by HPD-AHM Co., which has been used in the IndyCar Series since 2012.

Specifications
Engine type: Honda V-6 - twin-turbocharged
Capacity: 
HP rating:  (depending on turbo boost pressure used at track)
Max. RPM/Rev limiter: 12,000 rpm; 12,200 rpm (overtake; push-to-pass) 
Weight: 
Oil system: Dry-sump lubrication
Turbocharger: Twin - BorgWarner EFR7163
Turbocharger boost levels (speedway / 1.5-mile oval / road-street course / push-to-pass):   /  /  / 
Camshafts: Double-overhead camshafts
Valve actuation: Finger-follower
Valve springs: Wire-type
Cylinder head: 4 valves (titanium) per cylinder
Fuel injection: Keihin 6x direct in-cylinder fuel. Keihin 6x high pressure port injectors
Fuel: Sunoco E85 (85% Ethanol, 15% racing gasoline) 
Block & head material: Aluminum
Crankshaft: Billet steel
Con rods: Billet steel
Pistons: Billet aluminum
Intake systems: Single plenum - carbon-fiber
Throttle systems: Electronic throttle control
Electronic control unit: McLaren Electronics - TAG-400I
Engine service life: 2,500–2,850 miles
Gearbox: Sequential gearbox, paddle-shift

Applications
Dallara IR-12

References

External links
Honda Performance Development official website
IndyCar Series official website

Engines by model
Honda engines
IndyCar Series
V6 engines